Ihtiman is a town in western Bulgaria, part of Sofia Province. It is located in the Ihtimanska Sredna Gora mountains and lies in a valley 48 km from Sofia and 95 km from Plovdiv, close to the Trakiya motorway.

Formerly a Roman defensive station guarding the important roads to the Bosphorus, Ihtiman was then called Stipon. It continued to play this role under the Byzantine Empire and the Bulgarian Empire, which however shifted its main defensive centre in the region to the Gate of Trajan hill pass.

Following the Ottoman domination in the 14th century, the town's name was changed to Ihtiman, which is thought to be of Ottoman Turkish origin.

The traditional and dominant religion is Eastern Orthodox Christianity.

Ihtiman Hook on Livingston Island in the South Shetland Islands, Antarctica is named after Ihtiman.

Climate 
Ihtiman has a temperate continental climate with very  cold and snowy winters and not too hot, relatively short summers. The average annual temperature is 8.9C.

Municipality
Ihtiman is also the seat of Ihtiman municipality (part of Sofia Province), which includes the following 27 villages:

Twin-towns
  Klimovsk
  Ílhavo

Notes

External links
 Information portal for IHTIMAN	
 Portal of IHTIMAN municipality